Freedom Air was an airline based in Barrigada, Guam, operated scheduled passenger and cargo services in Guam and the Northern Mariana Islands. Its headquarters is located in Guam's Antonio B. Won Pat International Airport.

The airline operated scheduled FAR part 121 passenger service between Guam, Rota and Saipan using a 30-seat Shorts 360 aircraft. Part 135 operations serve the Saipan-Tinian route using Piper Cherokee aircraft. It also operated cargo services using a Shorts 330 cargo conversion aircraft.

Destinations

Guam (United States)
Guam (Antonio B. Won Pat International Airport) Main Hub

Northern Mariana Islands (United States)
Rota (Rota International Airport)
Saipan (Saipan International Airport) Hub
Tinian (Tinian International Airport)

Fleet 
The Freedom Air fleet includes the following aircraft (at March 2007):

1 Shorts 330-200 Sherpa Cargo configuration
1 Shorts 360-300 (30 Seat passenger configuration)

As of August 2006, the airline also operated:
Piper PA-31 Navajo (7 Seat passenger configuration)
Piper PA-23 Aztec (6 Seat passenger configuration)
Piper PA-28 Cherokee (6 Seat passenger configuration)
Cessna 172 Skyhawk (3 Seat passenger configuration)

References

External links
Official Freedom Air website

Airlines of Guam
Companies of Guam
Economic history of Guam
Airlines established in 1974
1974 establishments in Guam